Obrapa is a genus of flies in the family Stratiomyidae.

Species
Obrapa celyphoides Walker, 1858
Obrapa leucostigma Bezzi, 1928
Obrapa perilampoides Walker, 1858

References

Stratiomyidae
Brachycera genera
Taxa named by Francis Walker (entomologist)
Diptera of Australasia